Nong Phai is a district (amphoe) in the southern part of Phetchabun province, northern Thailand.

History
The area was created as a minor district (king amphoe) in 1961. It was upgraded to a full district in 1963.

Geography
Neighboring district are (from the east clockwise) Nong Bua Daeng and Phakdi Chumphon of Chaiyaphum province, Bueng Sam Phan, Chon Daen and Mueang Phetchabun of Phetchabun Province.

The main water resource is the Pa Sak River.

Administration
The district is divided into 13 sub-districts (tambons), which are further subdivided into 135 villages (mubans). There are six townships (thesaban tambons) in the district: Ban Phot, Bo Thai, Bua Watthana, Chaliang Thong, Na Chaliang, and Nong Phai, each covering parts of the same-named tambon. There are a further 13 tambon administrative organizations (TAO).

Nong Phai